Kristiyan Velinov (born 1 August 1991) is a Bulgarian footballer. He currently plays as a defender for FC Oborishte.

External links
 
 

Living people
1991 births
Bulgarian footballers
First Professional Football League (Bulgaria) players
Association football defenders
PFC CSKA Sofia players
Akademik Sofia players
FC Pomorie players